Alex Cameron may refer to:

Alex Cameron (musician), Australian musician
Alex Cameron (academic) (1937–2003), academic, English professor
Alex Cameron (artist) (born 1947), visual artist in Toronto, Ontario
Alex Cameron (bishop) (born 1964), Canadian-born American Anglican bishop
Alexander Cameron (barrister) (born 1963), English barrister, brother of former Prime Minister

See also
 Alec Cameron (disambiguation)